Mario Pagotto (14 December 1911 – August 1992) was an Italian footballer who played as a defender. On 14 April 1940, he represented the Italy national football team on the occasion of a friendly match against Romania in a 2–1 home win.

Honours

Player
Bologna
Serie A: 1936–37, 1938–39, 1940–41

References

1911 births
1992 deaths
Italian footballers
Italy international footballers
Association football defenders
Pordenone Calcio players
Bologna F.C. 1909 players